Psalm 16 is the 16th psalm in the Book of Psalms, beginning in English in the King James Version: "Preserve me, O God: for in thee do I put my trust." 

In the slightly different numbering system used in the Greek Septuagint and Latin Vulgate translations of the Bible, this psalm is Psalm 15. The Latin version begins "Conserva me Domine".

The psalm is attributed to David and described as a Michtam of David. Psalms 56-60 also share this title. Sarah Hoyt describes this term as "obscure". Semitic scholar Paul Haupt suggests that it may mean "restricted by the meter", or "conformed to poetical measure". The psalm forms a regular part of Jewish, Catholic, Anglican, Eastern Orthodox Church and Protestant liturgies. It has been set to music, including compositions by Marc-Antoine Charpentier and George Frideric Handel.

Text

Hebrew Bible version 
Following is the Hebrew text of Psalm 16:

King James Version 
 Preserve me, O God: for in thee do I put my trust.
 O my soul, thou hast said unto the LORD, Thou art my Lord: my goodness extendeth not to thee;
 But to the saints that are in the earth, and to the excellent, in whom is all my delight.
 Their sorrows shall be multiplied that hasten after another god: their drink offerings of blood will I not offer, nor take up their names into my lips.
 The LORD is the portion of mine inheritance and of my cup: thou maintainest my lot.
 The lines are fallen unto me in pleasant places; yea, I have a goodly heritage.
 I will bless the LORD, who hath given me counsel: my reins also instruct me in the night seasons.
 I have set the LORD always before me: because he is at my right hand, I shall not be moved.
 Therefore my heart is glad, and my glory rejoiceth: my flesh also shall rest in hope.
 For thou wilt not leave my soul in hell; neither wilt thou suffer thine Holy One to see corruption.
 Thou wilt shew me the path of life: in thy presence is fulness of joy; at thy right hand there are pleasures for evermore.

Composition
Charles and Emilie Briggs summarized its contents as follows:

According to the Briggs, the author of this Psalm drew on Jeremiah 23:6, 33:16; Deuteronomy 33:12; and the Book of Ezra for phrases and concepts, and most likely wrote the Psalm in the Persian period (i.e., after 539 BCE).

Uses

Judaism
Verse 3 is found in Pirkei Avot Chapter 6, no. 10.

Psalm 16 is one of the ten psalms of the Tikkun HaKlali of Rebbe Nachman of Breslov.

New Testament
The following verses of Psalm 16 are referenced in the New Testament:
 Verses 8-11 are quoted in Acts 
 Verse 10b is quoted in Acts .
In those cases both Peter and Paul applied Psalm 16 to Jesus' resurrection and not to David's life.

Book of Common Prayer
In the Church of England's Book of Common Prayer, Psalm 16 is appointed to be read on the morning of the third day of the month.

Musical settings 
Heinrich Schütz wrote a setting of a metric paraphrase of Psalm 16 in German, "Bewahr mich, Gott, ich trau auf dich", SWV 112, for the Becker Psalter, published first in 1628. In 1699, Marc-Antoine Charpentier wrote "Conserva me Domine", H.230, for soloists, chorus, strings, and continuo. The King James Version of verse 10 is used in Handel's oratorio Messiah, HWV 56.

References

External links 

 
 
  in Hebrew and English - Mechon-mamre
 Text of Psalm 16 according to the 1928 Psalter
 A miktam of David. / Keep me safe, O God; in you I take refuge. text and footnotes, usccb.org United States Conference of Catholic Bishops
 Psalm 16:1 introduction and text, biblestudytools.com
 Psalm 16 – The Benefits of a Life-Commitment to God enduringword.com
 Psalm 16 / Refrain: The Lord is at my right hand; I shall not fall. Church of England
 Hymns for Psalm 16 hymnary.org
 Charles Spurgeon's commentary on Psalm 16 

016
Works attributed to David